Thomas Adair Butler VC (12 February 1836 – 17 May 1901) was an English recipient of the Victoria Cross, the highest and most prestigious award for gallantry in the face of the enemy that can be awarded to British and Commonwealth forces.

Early life

Born at Soberton, Hampshire. He was the son of the Rev. Stephen Butler, of Bury Lodge, Hambledon, Hampshire, by his first wife Mary Ann Thistlethwayte, daughter of Thomas Thistlethwayte (1779–1850), of Southwick Park; Deputy Lieutenant of Hampshire, hereditary Constable of Porchester Castle and warden of the Forest of Bere. He was a nephew of Rear-Admiral Sir Francis Augustus Collier.

He was educated privately and gazetted as Ensign to the 1st Bengal European Fusiliers, 9 June 1854; Lieutenant, 23 November 1856, and was afterwards Instructor of Musketry. He served in the Indian Mutiny from 10 June 1857, was in all the engagements under the walls of Delhi, was galloper to General Nicholson at the action of Nugafshot, and took part in the Storming of Delhi. He also took part in the actions of Gungehri, Pu and Minpoorie and was present at the Siege and capture of Lucknow where he won the Victoria Cross.

Details
He was 22 years old, and a lieutenant in the 1st European Bengal Fusiliers (later Royal Munster Fusiliers) during the Indian Mutiny when the following deed took place on 9 March 1858 at Lucknow, India, for which he was awarded the VC:

Further information
He later served in the Umbeyla Campaign and achieved the rank of major in the service of the 101st Regiment of Foot.

The medal
His Victoria Cross is displayed at the Royal Military Academy, Sandhurst.

References

Location of grave and VC medal (Surrey)
Short Bio

1836 births
1901 deaths
Military personnel from Hampshire
British East India Company Army officers
Royal Munster Fusiliers officers
British recipients of the Victoria Cross
Indian Rebellion of 1857 recipients of the Victoria Cross
People from the City of Winchester
British military personnel of the Umbeyla Campaign